The 1979–80 Serie A season was the 78th edition of Serie A, the top-level football competition in Italy. The championship was won by Internazionale. A.C. Milan were relegated for the first time in their history following a match fixing scandal.

Teams
Udinese, Cagliari and Pescara had been promoted from Serie B.

Events
Following the creation of the UEFA ranking, Italy lost two out of its four places in the UEFA Cup inherited from the Fairs Cup.

Final classification

Results

Top goalscorers

References

Almanacco Illustrato del Calcio – La Storia 1898–2004, Panini Edizioni, Modena, September 2005

External links
 Results, goalscorers, goal times and standings by round - RSSSF

1979-80
Italy
1